was a Japanese voice actress from Matsuyama, Ehime. She was attached to Aoni Production at the time of her death. Niiyama was most known for the roles of Kou Seiya/Sailor Star Fighter in the Pretty Soldier Sailor Moon series, Risa Kanzaki in Neighborhood Story, Suou Takamura in Clamp School Detectives and Deedlit in Record of Lodoss War: Chronicles of the Heroic Knight. She was also involved in one voice actor group, Virgo, who are the voice actresses of the anime and game, Ojōsama Sōsamō.

Niiyama was diagnosed with leukemia in 1998 and later returned for a bone marrow transplant on February 7, 2000. At approximately 6:23 A.M., Niiyama suffered a bout of internal bleeding in her lung and died as a result of complications from leukemia. Niiyama was 29 years old at the time of her death. Her final performance was in the TV series Record of Lodoss War: Chronicles of the Heroic Knight as the voice of Deedlit.

Filmography
Hiroko in Aoki Densetsu Shoot! 
Teppei Kisugi (young), Natsuko Ōzora in Captain Tsubasa J 
Doris in Marmalade Boy 
Risa Kanzaki in Gokinjo Monogatari 
Dealer (ep 12), Judau's mother (ep 23) in Kuso Kagaku Sekai Gulliver Boy 
Seiya Kou/Sailor Star Fighter in Sailor Moon Sailor Stars 
Fuyumi in Sailor Moon SuperS
Blue delmo Valerie in Agent Aika
Dorm Chief in Battle Athletes
Rie Shibusawa in Battle Skipper
Sakada no Jiisan no Tsuma in Chibi Maruko-chan
Suou Takamura in CLAMP School Detectives
Kimiko Ayanokōji in Debutante Detective Corps
Juai in Detatoko Princess
Myonsaku Kim in Fatal Fury: The Motion Picture
Atore in Hakugei: Legend of the Moby Dick
Mao in Hyper Police (ep 19)
Announcer A in Nanatsu no Umi no Tico (ep 36)
Nursery School Teacher in Ogre Slayer
Rei in Perfect Blue (movie)
Deedlit in Record of Lodoss War: Chronicles of the Heroic Knight
Kobachi-chan in Soreike! Anpanman
Momiji Kagariya in Starship Girl Yamamoto Yohko
Tachiki's wife in Vampire Princess Miyu (ep 17)
Hidenori in You're Under Arrest (Ep 46)
Narrator in BS Tantei Club: Yuki ni Kieta Kako
Fake Goddess Althena in Lunar 2: Eternal Blue

External links
Niiyama Shiho at Hitoshi Doi's site
 - Information on the actress

1970 births
2000 deaths
People from Matsuyama, Ehime
Japanese voice actresses
Deaths from leukemia
20th-century Japanese actresses
Aoni Production voice actors